The (Roman Catholic) Archdiocese of Thare and Nonseng (Archidioecesis Tharensis et Nonsengensis;) is located in the north-east of Thailand. It is based in Tha Rae, a subdistrict municipality (thesaban tambon) in the Mueang Sakon Nakhon district.

The diocese covers an area of 25,477 km², covering four provinces of Thailand - Kalasin, Mukdahan, Nakhon Phanom and Sakon Nakhon. As of 2001, of the 3.1 million citizen 49,489 are member of the Catholic Church. It is divided into 30 parishes, having 51 priests altogether. By December 31, 2006, the archdiocese had 51,275 Catholics, 1.61 percent of the territory's population.

3 dioceses are suffragans of the archdiocese:
 Nakhon Ratchasima
 Ubon Ratchathani
 Udon Thani

History
The archdiocese traces its origin back to the Vicariate Apostolic of Laos, which was established on May 4, 1899, responsible for all of what is now northeast Thailand and modern-day Laos. The seat of the vicariate was at Ban Nonseng, Nakhon Phanom Province. In 1938 the northern part was split off to create the Prefecture Apostolic of Vientiane and Luang-Prabang. After the independence of Laos in 1949 the vicariate was divided: on December 21, 1950, the Laotian part was split off to create the Prefecture Apostolic of Thakhek, while the Thai part became the Vicariate Apostolic of Thare. In 1960 it was renamed the Vicariate Apostolic of Thare and Nonseng, and was promoted as the Archdiocese of Thare and Nonseng on December 18, 1965.

Cathedral
The St. Michael the Archangel Cathedral is located in Ban Tha Rae, Tha Rae subdistrict, Mueang Sakon Nakhon district, at the northern shore of the Nong Han Lake, .

Bishops
Before Thare and Nonseng became a diocese, the administrator had the title vicar, but was also a titular bishop.  The ordinary was raised to Archbishop on 18 December 1965.
Marie-Joseph Cuaz, M.E.P.: June 22, 1899 - 1912
Constant-Jean Prodhomme, M.E.P.: June 2, 1913 - August 20, 1920
Ange-Marie Joseph Gouin, M.E.P.: April 26, 1922 - July 1, 1943
Henri-Albert Thomine, M.E.P.: July 29, 1944 - March 21, 1945
Claudius Philippe Bayet, M.E.P.: April 10, 1947 - May 7, 1953
Bf. Michael On Prakhongchit, 1953-1959
Michel Kien Samophithak: 1959 - March 6, 1980
Lawrence Khai Saen-Phon-On: March 6, 1980 - May 14, 2004
Louis Chamniern Santisukniram: July 1, 2005 - May 13, 2020
Anthony Weradet Chaiseri: May 13, 2020 - present

References

Sources
catholic-hierarchy

External links
Homepage of the diocese
catholic-hierarchy.org

Thare and Nonseng
Thare
Kalasin province
Mukdahan province
Nakhon Phanom province
Sakon Nakhon province
1899 establishments in Siam